Cleobury Mortimer is a civil parish in Shropshire, England.  It contains 77 listed buildings that are recorded in the National Heritage List for England.  Of these, two are listed at Grade I, the highest of the three grades, three are at Grade II*, the middle grade, and the others are at Grade II, the lowest grade.  The parish contains the market town of Cleobury Mortimer and the surrounding countryside.  Most of the listed buildings are in the town, a high proportion of them along its main street named Ludlow Road, then High Street, Church Street, and Lower Street.  Most of the listed buildings are houses and associated structures, cottages, shops and public houses, the others including a church and items in the churchyard, former schools, the remains of a wayside cross, a mounting block, a bank, a civic hall, a former toll house, a horse trough and drinking fountain, a war memorial, and two telephone kiosks.  Outside the town, the listed buildings include a country house and its stable block, farmhouses, a milestone, and a bridge.


Key

Buildings

References

Citations

Sources

Lists of buildings and structures in Shropshire
Listed buildings